The British Academy Video Games Award for Game Beyond Entertainment is an award presented annually by the British Academy of Film and Television Arts (BAFTA). It is given in honor of "games that deliver a transformational experience beyond pure entertainment".

The category was first announced on 19 October 2017 and was first awarded at the 14th British Academy Games Awards. Unlike other categories which place emphasis on aspects such as gameplay, animation and technical achievement, entries in Game Beyond Entertainment are judged solely on content, with a specific focus on the game's emotional impact, thematic fit and innovative use of the medium to explore and deliver impactful messages. Throughout its run, the category had awarded and nominated games depicting a range of important social issues and emotional experiences including coping with mental health issues such as depression, anxiety, PTSD and psychosis, dementia, coping with grief and loss, LGBT themes, racial injustice, climate change, censorship and coming of age.

The category was first presented in 2018 at the 14th British Academy Games Awards to Hellblade: Senua's Sacrifice. To date, no developer or publisher has won the award more than once. Among developers, Don't Nod have the most nominations, with three, while Finji, Nintendo, Sony Interactive Entertainment and Square Enix are tied as the most-nominated publishers, with three each.

The current holder of the award is Before Your Eyes by Goodbye World and Skybound Games, which won at the 18th British Academy Games Awards in 2022.

Winners and nominees
In the following table, the years are listed as per BAFTA convention, and generally correspond to the year of game release in the United Kingdom.

Multiple nominations and wins

Developers

Publishers

References

Video game award ceremonies
Game Beyond Entertainment